|}

The Challenge Stakes is a Group 2 flat horse race in Great Britain open to horses aged three years or older. It is run on the Rowley Mile at Newmarket over a distance of 7 furlongs (1,408 metres), and it is scheduled to take place each year in October.

History
The event was established in 1878, and the inaugural edition was titled the First Great Challenge Stakes. It was originally contested over six furlongs and open to horses aged two or older.

The present system of race grading was introduced in 1971, and for a period the Challenge Stakes held Group 3 status. It was extended to seven furlongs in 1977, and closed to two-year-olds in 1985. It was promoted to Group 2 level in 1987.

The race was formerly staged during Newmarket's Champions' Day meeting in mid-October. It became part of a new fixture called Future Champions Day in 2011.

Records

Most successful horse (2 wins):

 Energy – 1882, 1884
 Mephisto – 1886, 1890
 Kilcock – 1896, 1897
 Sonatura – 1900, 1901
 Chacornac – 1902, 1903
 Succour – 1907, 1908
 Hornet's Beauty – 1912, 1914
 Phalaris – 1917, 1918
 Boldboy – 1973, 1977
 Moorestyle – 1980, 1981
 Limato - 2017, 2018

Leading jockey (7 wins):
 Lester Piggott – Princely Gift (1954), Forlorn River (1967), Mountain Call (1968), Abergwaun (1972), Moorestyle (1980, 1981), Salieri (1983)

Leading trainer (6 wins):
 Barry Hills – Asteroid Field (1987), Distant Relative (1989), Last Resort (2000), Munir (2001), Miss Lucifer (2007), Red Jazz (2010)

Winners since 1977

Earlier winners

 1878: Lollypop
 1879: Rayon d'Or
 1880: Thebais
 1881: Nellie
 1882: Energy
 1883: Busybody
 1884: Energy
 1885: Modwena
 1886: Mephisto
 1887: Kilwarlin
 1888: Sandal
 1889: Heaume
 1890: Mephisto
 1891: Sir Frederick Roberts
 1892: St Angelo
 1893: Dame President
 1894: Whittier
 1895: Amandier / Chasseur 
 1896: Kilcock
 1897: Kilcock
 1898: Heir Male
 1899: Fosco
 1900: Sonatura
 1901: Sonatura
 1902: Chacornac
 1903: Chacornac
 1904: Delaunay
 1905: Thrush
 1906: Rocketter
 1907: Succour
 1908: Succour
 1909: Sir Martin
 1910: Jack Snipe
 1911: Iron Mask
 1912: Hornet's Beauty
 1913: Borrow
 1914: Hornet's Beauty
 1915: Golden Sun
 1916: King's Joker
 1917: Phalaris
 1918: Phalaris
 1919: Diadem
 1920: Poltava
 1921: Sunblaze
 1922: Two Step
 1923: Black Gown
 1924: Drake
 1925: Twelve Pointer
 1926: Diomedes
 1927: Highborn II
 1928: Nice Prospect
 1929: Reedsmouth
 1930: Soloptic
 1931: Portlaw
 1932: The Divot
 1933: Myrobella
 1934: Mate
 1935: Bellacose
 1936: Solerina
 1937: Ipsden
 1938: Old Reliance
 1939–44: no race
 1945: Royal Charger
 1946: Daily Double
 1947: Closeburn
 1948: The Cobbler
 1949: Combined Operations
 1950: Bob Cherry
 1951: Hard Sauce
 1952: Agitator
 1953: Parakeet
 1954: Princely Gift
 1955: Royal Palm
 1956: Coronation Year
 1957: Welsh Abbot
 1958: Logarithm
 1959–66: no race
 1967: Forlorn River
 1968: Mountain Call
 1969: Burglar
 1970: Realm
 1971: Joshua
 1972: Abergwaun
 1973: Boldboy
 1974: New Model
 1975: Be Tuneful
 1976: Star Bird

See also
 Horse racing in Great Britain
 List of British flat horse races

References
 Paris-Turf: 
 Racing Post:

 galopp-sieger.de – Challenge Stakes.
 ifhaonline.org – International Federation of Horseracing Authorities – Challenge Stakes (2019).
 pedigreequery.com – Challenge Stakes – Newmarket.
 

Flat races in Great Britain
Newmarket Racecourse
Open mile category horse races
Recurring sporting events established in 1878
1878 establishments in England